BRF TV (also known as BRF Fernsehen) is a German-language television channel in Belgium.

It is owned by the Belgian public broadcaster Belgischer Rundfunk and transmitted via cable in the German-speaking Community of Belgium and throughout the country via IPTV.

Programming 
 Blickpunkt website: regional news program aired 15 minutes from Monday to Friday at 17:45, rebroadcast at 06:00 in the morning. This covers news, economic, cultural, political and sports in the region, followed by a weather report.
 Blick ins Inland: To meet the information needs of viewers on the Belgian domestic politics, the BRF broadcasts the magazine every day with visuals from RTBF.
 Treffpunkt: Monday talk show produced by the press center of the German-speaking Community of Belgium and presented by the facilitators of the BRF.
 Fit & Gesund: program dedicated to health and well-being broadcast every second Thursday of the month in cooperation with the Ministry of Health of the German-speaking Community of Belgium.
 BRF-TV-Wochenrückblick and 7en1 (Televesdre) broadcast on Saturday at 12:45 and Sunday night at 22:45.

External links 
  Official site of BRF TV

German-language television stations
Television channels in Belgium
Television channels and stations established in 1999
1999 establishments in Belgium